Phygasia fulvipennis is a species of flea beetle in the family Chrysomelidae, found in eastern Asia.

References

External links

 

Alticini